Boylen is a surname. Notable people with the name include:

 Dave Boylen (born 1947), English football midfielder and politician
 Frank Boylen (1878–1938), English rugby player
 James Boylen (1907–1970), Canadian businessman and Thoroughbred racehorse owner
 Jim Boylen (born 1965), American basketball coach
 John Boylen (1898–1961), Scottish footballer

See also
 Boylan, surname
 Nelson A. Boylen Collegiate Institute, located in Toronto